In Hinduism, especially Shaktism (a theological tradition of Hinduism), Shakti (Devanagari: शक्ति, IAST: Śakti; lit. "Energy, ability, strength, effort, power, capability") is the primordial cosmic energy, female in aspect. Shakti represents the dynamic forces that are thought to move through the universe.

Shakti often refers to the wife of Shiva. A few common names for Shakti are Mulaprakruti, meaning the root substance, and Maha maya.

Origins

One of the oldest representations of the goddess in India is in a triangular form. The Baghor stone, found in a Paleolithic context in the Son River valley and dating to 9,000–8,000 BCE, is considered an early example of a yantra. Kenoyer, part of the team that excavated the stone, considered that it was highly probable that the stone was associated with Shakti. The veneration of Shiva and Shakti was also prevalent in Indus valley civilization.

Mariamman
The Shakti goddess has been syncretised with the Amman of South Indian tradition, especially in the states of Karnataka, Tamil Nadu, Kerala, Telangana, and Andhra Pradesh. There are many temples devoted to various incarnations of the Shakti goddess in most of the villages in South India. The people of the countryside believe that Amman is the bringer of rain, the protector of the village, the punisher of evil people, the cure of diseases, and the one who gives welfare to the village. They celebrate Shakti festivities with great pomp annually. Some examples of the deities assimilated into Shakti are Mahalakshmi, Kamakshi, Parvati, Lalita, Bhuvaneshwari, Durga, Meenakshi, Mariamman, Yellamma, Poleramma, Saraswati and Perantalamma.

Shaktism

Shaktism regards Devi (lit., "the Goddess") as the Supreme Brahman itself with all other forms of divinity considered to be merely Her diverse manifestations. In the details of its philosophy and practice, Shaktism resembles Shaivism. However, Shaktas, practitioners of Shaktism, focus most or all worship on Shakti, as the dynamic feminine aspect of the Supreme Divine. Shiva, the masculine aspect of divinity, is considered solely transcendent, and Shiva's worship is usually secondary.

From Devi-Mahatmya:

From Shaktisangama Tantra:

Adi Parashakti

Smarta Advaita
In the Smarta Advaita sect of Hinduism, Shakti is considered to be one of five equal personal forms of God in the panchadeva system advocated by Adi Shankara.

See also

Notes

References

Further reading

External links

 

Consorts of Shiva
Hindu goddesses
Hindu philosophical concepts
Hindu tantra
Mother goddesses
Names of God in Hinduism
Shaktism
Tantric practices
Vitalism